The Marbella International Film Festival has been held in Marbella on the Costa del Sol in Spain since 2006. It provides a venue for encouraging artists from all parts of the world.

The festival was started by the New World Trust, a non-profit organization.

The festival includes an "Art at the Fringe" program where artists in other media may display their work, including sculpture, photographs, fashion, jewelry and performance arts.

References

External links

Film festivals in Spain